Re-Animated is a television film that aired on Cartoon Network on December 8, 2006. It was the first original production on the genre for the network. It was released on DVD on September 11, 2007, and serves as a pilot for the follow-up series Out of Jimmy's Head, which premiered on September 14, 2007. It was panned by critics upon release.

The film's animation was produced by Renegade Animation, which previously produced Hi Hi Puffy AmiYumi for Cartoon Network.

Plot
Middle school student Jimmy Roberts is often taken advantage of by his peers. During his class trip to Gollyworld, an amusement park themed around animated cartoon characters created by the deceased animator Milt Appleday, Jimmy misses out on many of the attractions. The popular students then, on the suggestion of Jimmy's best friend Craig, tell Jimmy to search for Appleday's frozen brain in the ride "Tux's Arctic Adventure". Jimmy unwillingly goes there and bumps into Milt's middle-aged, clumsy son Sonny, who is attempting to retrieve the brain. Jimmy quickly flees and accidentally runs onto the path of another oncoming attraction: "Crocco's Train". He is sent to an on-premises hospital, where Milt's brain is transplanted into his head. He survives the operation with his personality intact, but he can now see all of Appleday's characters in real life, while no one else can.

With the help of his crush, Craig's sister Robin, Jimmy learns that Sonny unwittingly ruined the characters' popularity through his own ideas. When Jimmy is hired as the new president of Appleday Pictures, replacing Sonny, mascot character Golly Gopher believes Jimmy can quickly make him a star again. With Milt's creativity and imagination, Jimmy becomes immensely popular but no longer has time for school or his friends.

Meanwhile, Sonny deceives Jimmy's father into letting him rent out a room in Jimmy's house. Sonny has dinner with the Roberts family while scheming to remove Milt's brain from Jimmy's head. He devises a plan to modify Crocco's Train to include several dangerous devices that will decapitate Jimmy. However, he yells this plan out loud, and Yancy, Jimmy's alien sister, catches on.

Robin attempts to point out to Jimmy that the cartoons are taking advantage of him, but he denies this. He leaves for his television debut, and Sonny takes her hostage. At the studio, Jimmy tells Golly that being the president of Appleday Studios hasn't gotten him what he really wanted. Furious, Golly scolds him for being a pushover. Jimmy realizes Robin was right and denounces his position as president on-air. He then finds out Sonny has tied Robin to the train tracks. Golly apologizes for his anger and temporarily changes Jimmy into a cartoon knight in shining armor. Jimmy goes inside the train and destroys the engine, saving Robin. Jimmy dresses up as Milt to momentarily distract Sonny by appealing to his affection for his father. Yancy teleports Jimmy to safety. Robin and Jimmy return to Craig's house, and they mend their "friendship". However, since the partygoers there were watching Jimmy's announcement and saw him talk about the importance of friendship over popularity, they leave.

In an epilogue, while Jimmy is leaving for school, Sonny almost succeeds at extracting Jimmy's brain with a crane-like device but misses.

Cast

Live-action cast
 Dominic Janes as Jimmy Roberts, a student who has an animator’s preserved brain transplanted into his head, enabling him to experience and interact with visions of cartoon characters.
 Matt Knudsen as Sonny Appleday, the scheming son of the late Milt Appleday, who is determined to claim his father’s brain for himself.
 Bil Dwyer as Ken Roberts, Jimmy and Yancy’s father.
 Eunice Cho as Robin Yoshida, Craig’s sister and Jimmy’s crush.
 Micah Karns as Craig Yoshida, Robin’s brother and Jimmy’s "best friend".
 Rhea Lando as Yancy Roberts, Jimmy’s adopted older sister from an alien planet.
 Rachel Quaintance as Louisa Roberts, Jimmy and Yancy’s mother.
 Tom Kenny as Appleday Board Member.
 Fred Willard as Milt Appleday, a deceased animator who founded Appleday Pictures and created the characters Jimmy sees. He is loosely based on animator Walt Disney.
 Stephanie Courtney as Donna.

Voice cast
 Paul Reubens as Golly Gopher, an energetic gopher and Milt Appleday’s most famous character. He is loosely based on Disney character and mascot Mickey Mouse.
 Ellen Greene as Dolly Gopher, Golly’s female counterpart and love interest. She is loosely based on Disney character Minnie Mouse.
 Tom Kenny as Tux, a penguin who enjoys performing stand-up comedy despite his inability to tell jokes. He is loosely based on Disney character Donald Duck.
 Brian Posehn as Crocco, a bumbling but outgoing alligator. He is loosely based on Disney character Goofy.

Two nonverbal cartoon characters, Prickles and Pickles (a porcupine and a pickle, respectively), also appear. They are loosely based on Tom Cat and Jerry Mouse, stars of the Tom and Jerry animated franchise.

Songs

 "Re-Animated" (Johnny Colt)
 "The Meat Song" (Jared Forber)
 "The Party Song" (Matt Crocco)
 "Mittens' Revenge" (Johnny Colt)
 "Pure" (Superchick)
 "Today" (Joshua Rodin)
 "My Only Friend" (Ronnie Day)
 "The Love Song" (Matt Crocco)
 "K.I.T." (Johnny Colt)
 "Closer" (Joshua Rodin)
 "I Hope Tomorrow is Like Today" (Guster)
 "Cha Cha" (Chelo)
 "It's On" (Superchick)
 "Greatest Day" (Bowling for Soup)
 "Yr. My Ringo" (The Face of Hans)
 "Jimmy Hides" (Sherman Foote)

Reception
Re-Animated was panned by critics, with the writing, humor, characters, acting, plot and the blend of animation with live action receiving the most criticism. Emily Ashby of Common Sense Media called it a "brain-swap tale [that] will have tweens' eyes rolling".

References

External links

 
 Re-Animated at the Big Cartoon DataBase

2006 television films
2006 films
American films with live action and animation
Cartoon Network television films
Cartoon Network franchises
American children's animated comedy films
Television films as pilots
Brookwell McNamara Entertainment films
Cartoon Network original programming
Cryonics in fiction
Psychedelic films
2000s English-language films
2000s American films
Films about gophers
Films about organ transplantation